Cui Tiankai (born October 1952) is a Chinese diplomat and longest-serving Chinese Ambassador to the United States, a role he filled from April 2013 to June 2021.

Early life and education 
In 1952, Cui was born in Shanghai, China. He is a native of Ningbo, Zhejiang Province, China.

Cui went to Shanghai Foreign Language School and graduated from the School of Foreign Languages of East China Normal University. Following his graduation from East China Normal University, Cui studied interpretation at the Beijing Foreign Studies University.

Career 

Following his studies in Beijing, Cui traveled with a Chinese delegation to the United Nations to work as an interpreter in the General Assembly.  After working in the UN for five years, Cui returned to academia to pursue a postgraduate degree from Johns Hopkins University's Paul H. Nitze School of Advanced International Studies in Washington, D.C.

After graduating from Johns Hopkins University, Cui joined the Ministry of Foreign Affairs first as a deputy director of the Department of International Organizations and Conferences and then spokesmen for the Information Department. In 1997, Cui was appointed Minister Counselor to the United Nations, a position he held until 1999. Cui continued to work with the Ministry throughout the next decade and held notable positions such as Director General of the Department of Asian Affairs, assistant minister of the Ministry of Foreign Affairs, and Ambassador to Japan. In 2013, Cui was selected by the 12th Standing Committee of the National People's Congress, then appointed by President Xi Jinping as the Ambassador to the United States, pursuant to the National People's Congress decision. On 22 June 2021, after eight years, he announced that he would leave the position.

Opinions 
In 2012, the case of the blind activist Chen Guangcheng triggered a diplomatic dispute between China and the US. Chen was permitted to study law in mainland China before going to the US for further studies. When Cui saw the shortlist of the universities that the Americans recommended, he roared: "There's no way he's going to East China Normal, I will not share an alma mater with that man!"

On March 6, 2013, Cui was interviewed by reporters from China Youth Daily when he attended the National People's Congress. "The root cause of all problems in Sino-Japan relationship is whether Japan can accept a powerful and developed China." Cui then said, if Japan can recognize and solve this problem, all other problems can be resolved.

On October 8, 2013, Cui delivered a speech at the School of Advanced International Studies at the Johns Hopkins University. He said some Japanese believe that: "During World War II, Japan was only defeated by United States and her atom bombs. Therefore, Japan only needs to get along well with United States while ignoring other nations." "This is a downright incorrect viewpoint." Cui emphasizes that, "Japan was defeated by all the peace-loving people including both Chinese and American people. There will be dire consequences if Japan is misled by incorrect viewpoints about past history."

On July 12, 2016, Cui spoke at the Centre for Strategic and International Studies following China's rejection of the ruling of an international tribunal arbitration case submit by the Philippines. He asserted that the attempt at arbitration was illegal as it was done without Chinese consent. Cui expressed his hope for future diplomatic resolutions to disputes in the South China Sea, also expressed a wish for further more successful joint developments and activities with other countries.

Regarding the COVID-19 pandemic, Cui states that "the job of finding the source of the virus is one for scientists, not journalists and diplomats."

References

External links 
 Biography from the English version of the Ministry of Foreign Affairs of the People's Republic of China
 China Vitae Biography

Living people
Diplomats of the People's Republic of China
People's Republic of China politicians from Shanghai
1952 births
Paul H. Nitze School of Advanced International Studies alumni
East China Normal University alumni
Ambassadors of China to Japan
Ambassadors of China to the United States